A Rear Area Operations Center is a command and control facility that serves as an area and/or sub-area commander's planning, coordinating, monitoring, advising and directing agency for area security operations.

Units

References